The ALCO Century 425 was a four-axle,  diesel-electric locomotive. 91 were built between October 1964 and December 1966.

Cataloged as part of ALCO's "Century" line of locomotives, the C425 was an upgraded version of the C424. The C425 employed the same main generator found in General Electric's U25B model.

Original Owners

See also
List of ALCO diesel locomotives

References

External links
 

B-B locomotives
Century 425
Diesel-electric locomotives of the United States
Railway locomotives introduced in 1964
Standard gauge locomotives of the United States